Checcucci is an Italian surname. Notable people with the surname include:

Francesco Checcucci (born 1989), Italian footballer
Maurizio Checcucci (born 1974), Italian sprinter

Italian-language surnames